This is a list of Atlas rocket launches which took place during the period 1990-1999.

Launch statistics

Rocket configurations

Launch sites

Launch outcomes

1990

1991

1992

1993

1994

1995

1996

1997

1998

1999

Photo gallery

References

Atlas